Pakistan participated in the 1st South Asian Games held in Kathmandu, Nepal in September 1984. Its medal tally of 10 placed it third amongst the seven nations.

Athletes 
 Athletics: Haider Ali Shah; Muhammad Munir
 Boxing: Asghar Ali; Ilyas Ahmed; Syed Hussain Shah; Muhammad Yousaf
 Weightlifting: Ghulam Dastagir Butt; Abid Yousaf; Adib Akram

References

1984 South Asian Games
1984 in Pakistani sport
Pakistan at the South Asian Games